Hemlock Creek is a river located in Cayuga and Tompkins counties. It flows into Owasco Inlet by Locke, New York.

References

Rivers of Cayuga County, New York
Rivers of New York (state)
Rivers of Tompkins County, New York